Actual Entertainment was a video game development and publishing company founded in 1996 by Franz Lanzinger (Chairman) and Mark Robichek (President). They were primarily known for their development of the Gubble series. Actual Entertainment was acquired by Lanzinger Studio in December 2016.

Games

External links
Actual Entertainment's website
Lanzinger Studio's website
Twitter accounts of Actual Entertainment and Franz Lanzinger
Gubble on GameSpot
Gubble 2 on GameSpot
Gubble Buggy Racer on GameSpot

References 

Defunct video game companies of the United States
Video game development companies
Video game companies established in 1996